El hombre señalado is a 1957 Argentine drama film directed by Francis Lauric. It was entered into the 7th Berlin International Film Festival.

Cast
 Cristina Berys
 Homero Cárpena
 Enrique Chaico
 Raúl del Valle
 Mario Fortuna
 José María Gutiérrez
 Antonia Herrero
 Francisco López Silva
 Luis Otero
 Pedro Quartucci
 Miriam Sucre

References

External links 
 

1957 films
1950s Spanish-language films
Argentine black-and-white films
1957 drama films
Argentine drama films
1950s Argentine films